In quantum physics, exceptional points are singularities in the parameter space where two or more eigenstates (eigenvalues and eigenvectors) coalesce. These points appear in dissipative systems, which make the Hamiltonian describing the system non-Hermitian.

Photonics 
The losses in photonic systems, are a feature used to study non-Hermitian physics. Adding non-Hermiticity (such as dichroïsm) in photonic systems where exist Dirac points transforms these degeneracy points into a pair of exceptional points. It has been demonstrated experimentally in numerous photonic systems such as microcavities and photonic crystals. The first demonstration of exceptional points was done by Woldemar Voigt in 1902 in a crystal.

See also 

 Dirac cones
 Non-Hermitian quantum mechanics

References 

Quantum mechanics
Photonics